Margaret Ellis Rogers (born January 22, 1949) is an American Republican politician. She is a member of the Mississippi House of Representatives from the 14th District, being first elected in 2003.

References

External links
 Margaret Rogers at Mississippi House of Representatives

1949 births
Living people
Republican Party members of the Mississippi House of Representatives
People from Oxford, Mississippi
Women state legislators in Mississippi
21st-century American politicians
21st-century American women politicians